Anomia ephippium is a species of bivalve belonging to the family Anomiidae.

Distribution

A. ephippium is found primarily in sheltered conditions in the low intertidal and sublittoral zones.

They are distributed along coasts around the world. They are found on the South and West coasts of Britain, stretching North to Shetland and are also found on all coasts of Ireland. They are also found along the Atlantic Coasts of the United States ranging from Massachusetts to Florida.

Physiology

A. ephippium is commonly known as a jingle shell or saddle oyster. They are a benthic species that lives in depths from 25-200m. They are a filter-feeding epifaunal species that attach to hard substrates by the byssus.

Predation and Feeding

A. ephippium has a 2–3 cm large thin, brittle, translucent shell structured by foliated calcite. While calcitic shells are typically white, the concentrations of polyenes A. ephippium's shells give them hues ranging from white to yellow to gray to orange.

Bivalvia are often gonochoric, meaning they have two distinct sexes, but some are protandric hermaphrodites meaning they can change genders throughout their growth.

References

Anomiidae
Bivalves described in 1758
Taxa named by Carl Linnaeus